Albert G. Guokas (August 7, 1925 – August 2, 1990) was a professional basketball player who spent one season in the National Basketball Association as a member of the Denver Nuggets and the Philadelphia Warriors during the 1948–49 season. He attended Saint Joseph's University. His brother, Matt Sr. and nephew Matt were also professional basketball players.

References

External links

1925 births
1990 deaths
American men's basketball players
American people of Lithuanian descent
Basketball players from Philadelphia
Denver Nuggets (1948–1950) players
Forwards (basketball)
Philadelphia Warriors players
Saint Joseph's Hawks men's basketball players